Irakli Peak is the peak rising to 1350 m in the northwest part of Trakiya Heights on Trinity Peninsula, Antarctic Peninsula.  Situated 1.43 km northeast of Antonov Peak, 3.24 km southwest of Mount Canicula, 3.87 km west-northwest of Mount Daimler and 3.56 km north-northwest of Bozveli Peak.  Surmounting Russell West Glacier to the north and Russell East Glacier to the east.

The peak is named after the Irakli nature site on the Bulgarian Black Sea coast.

Location
German-British mapping in 1996.

Maps
 Trinity Peninsula. Scale 1:250000 topographic map No. 5697. Institut für Angewandte Geodäsie and British Antarctic Survey, 1996.
 Antarctic Digital Database (ADD). Scale 1:250000 topographic map of Antarctica. Scientific Committee on Antarctic Research (SCAR), 1993–2016.

Notes

References
 Bulgarian Antarctic Gazetteer. Antarctic Place-names Commission. (details in Bulgarian, basic data in English)
 Irakli Peak. SCAR Composite Antarctic Gazetteer

External links
 Irakli Peak. Copernix satellite image

Mountains of Trinity Peninsula
Bulgaria and the Antarctic